Swimming was contested at the 1978 Asian Games in Kasetsart University, Bangkok, Thailand from December 12 to December 17, 1978.

Medalists

Men

Women

Medal table

References 
 Results 12 December
 Results 13 December
 Results 14 December
 Results 16 December
 Results 17 December

External links
 Asian Swimming Federation

 
1978 Asian Games events
1978
Asian Games
1978 Asian Games